Carol Christine Hilaria Pounder (born December 25, 1952) is a Guyanese-born American actress. She has received four Primetime Emmy Award nominations for her roles in The X-Files, ER, The Shield, and The No. 1 Ladies' Detective Agency.

Pounder portrayed Dr. Angela Hicks in the medical drama series ER (1994–1997), Captain Claudette Wyms in the FX police drama series The Shield (2002–2008), Irene Frederic in Warehouse 13 (2009–2014), and District Attorney Tyne Patterson in Sons of Anarchy (2013–2014). From 2014 until the show's conclusion in 2021, she portrayed medical examiner Dr. Loretta Wade on the police drama series NCIS: New Orleans. Pounder was also the voice of Amanda Waller in the animated show Justice League Unlimited (2004–2006), a role that she has reprised in later DC Comics media.

In film, she appeared in All That Jazz (1979), Go Tell It on the Mountain  (1984), Prizzi's Honor (1985), Bagdad Cafe (1987), Postcards from the Edge (1990), Psycho IV: The Beginning (1990), Benny & Joon (1993), Demon Knight (1995), Face/Off (1997), End of Days (1999), Orphan (2009), Avatar (2009), The Mortal Instruments: City of Bones (2013), and Godzilla: King of the Monsters (2019).

Early life
Pounder was born in British Guiana (now Guyana) on December 25, 1952. Her full name, Carol Christine Hilaria Pounder, is in honor of her grandmothers and godmothers. She was raised on a sugar plantation that her father managed. Her mother worked at the United States Embassy while the family lived in London, England. Pounder attended a Catholic boarding school in Sussex, England. 

She matriculated at Hastings College of Arts and Technology where Pounder studied painting, but dropped out as a freshman after moving to the United States. Her family had already settled in New York while she was attending school. Pounder graduated from Ithaca College in 1975. Pounder stated her parents did not support her choice to be an actress, with her mother instead wanting Pounder to be a newscaster.

Career
Pounder made her acting debut in the film All That Jazz (1979). She continued her career in New York City theater, where she appeared in The Mighty Gents by playwright Richard Wesley, and Open Admissions on Broadway. She moved to Los Angeles in 1982. She starred in the film Bagdad Café, and has made smaller appearances in many other films.

She focused primarily on her television career. In the early 1980s, Pounder first appeared in guest roles on Hill Street Blues, and then on several shows (The Cosby Show, L.A. Law, The X-Files, Living Single, and Quantum Leap) before landing a long-running recurring role as Dr. Angela Hicks on ER from 1994 to 1997. She also co-starred in the Tales From the Crypt feature film Demon Knight (1995). She then returned to guest appearances on other shows, including The Practice, Law & Order: Special Victims Unit, Millennium, The West Wing (where she was considered for the role of C. J. Cregg), and the short-lived sitcom Women in Prison.

From 2002 to 2008, she starred as Detective Claudette Wyms in the FX police drama The Shield. For this role she was nominated for the Primetime Emmy Award for Outstanding Supporting Actress in a Drama Series in 2005 and an NAACP Image Award. She had previously been nominated for an Emmy in 1995 for guest starring in The X-Files and in 1997 for her supporting role on ER. She has also lent her voice to several video games and animated projects, including Aladdin and the King of Thieves, True Crime: Streets of LA, Gargoyles as Desdemona and Coldfire, and Justice League Unlimited as government agent Amanda Waller, which role she reprised for the animated film adaptation of the comic book Superman/Batman: Public Enemies as well as the video game Batman: Arkham Origins, its sequel Batman: Arkham Origins Blackgate, and another animated film that takes place in continuity with the games, Batman: Assault on Arkham.

Pounder was also one of the readers for the HBO film Unchained Memories: Readings from the Slave Narrative (2003). She appeared on the Syfy series Warehouse 13 from 2009 until its finale on May 19, 2014. Pounder also was one of the stars of Fox's cancelled 2009 sitcom Brothers. Pounder was nominated for the Emmy Award for Outstanding Guest Actress in a Drama Series for her appearance in the BBC/HBO series The No. 1 Ladies' Detective Agency. She had a recurring role as DA Thyne Patterson on the FX crime drama series Sons of Anarchy (2013–14). She co-starred in The Mortal Instruments: City of Bones (2013). In Disney's The Lion Guard she voices Kongwe, the wise old turtle.

Advocacy
As one of the founders of Artists for a New South Africa, Pounder has energized awareness of post-apartheid and HIV/AIDS issues. In an interview, she said about the pandemic: "When it's this massive disease, and it's affecting things in 5,000 different ways, it requires great strength and power—and there is power in numbers. So we need to involve as many people as we can, like we do with ANSA. I call it my little engine that could. It is a remarkable, tiny organization with a huge outreach. We use actors and artists with the biggest voices so they can use every opportunity to talk about AIDS."

Filmography

Film

Television

Video games

Awards and nominations

References

External links

 
 
 
 
 

1952 births
Living people
American film actresses
American television actresses
American video game actresses
American voice actresses
Guyanese emigrants to the United States
People from Georgetown, Guyana
20th-century American actresses
21st-century American actresses
HIV/AIDS activists